Kenny Stephenson (born 12 June 1938) is a British wrestler. He competed at the 1960 Summer Olympics and the 1964 Summer Olympics.

References

1938 births
Living people
British male sport wrestlers
Olympic wrestlers of Great Britain
Wrestlers at the 1960 Summer Olympics
Wrestlers at the 1964 Summer Olympics
Sportspeople from Bury, Greater Manchester